This page is a list of Lady and Gentleman Ushers of the Royal Household of the United Kingdom from the Restoration of the monarchy in 1660 up to the present day. 

Gentleman Ushers originally formed three classes: Gentleman Ushers of the Privy Chamber, Gentleman Ushers Daily Waiters and Gentleman Ushers Quarterly Waiters. The number of ordinary ushers of these classes were fixed at four, four, and eight respectively, but ushers "in extraordinary" were also sometimes appointed. 

After 1901 these distinctions between the Gentleman Ushers were abolished, except between the ordinary and extraordinary ushers (and two "honorary" ushers in the early 20th century). The first Lady Usher in Ordinary was appointed in 2021.  

There are currently 10 Lady and Gentleman Ushers with three representing the Royal Navy, four representing the Army and three representing the Royal Air Force. For more information on the Ushers' history and roles see Lady and Gentleman Usher.

Gentleman Ushers of the Privy Chamber
To 22 January 1901.

In Ordinary

In Extraordinary
2 June 1660 – bef. 5 August 1668: Sir Peter Killigrew
2 June 1660 – 12 July 1669: William Sandys
11 August 1660 – 21 April 1670?: Sir Ralph Clare
9 March 1661 – 29 January 1662?: Sir Hugh Pollard, 2nd Baronet
12 November 1673 – ?: Edward Russell
1 February 1675 – 20 December 1681: Charles Boyle
19 March 1716 – ?: Frederick Henning
25 February 1796 – 29 July 1798: Robert Chester
8 August 1833 – 12 March 1834: Sir John Mark Frederick Smith

Gentleman Ushers Daily Waiters
To 22 January 1901.

In Ordinary

Supernumerary
8 June 1660 – ?: Clement Sanders
14 July 1660 – ?: Roger Gardiner
27 July 1660  – ?: Ralph Wakerlin
3 October 1661 – ?: George Hopton

In Extraordinary
16 June 1675 – 24 November 1680: Henry Bulstrode
29 July 1715 – 24 March 1716: Thomas Brand

Gentleman Ushers Quarterly Waiters
To 22 January 1901.

In Ordinary

Supernumerary
14 September 1664 – ?: John Mercer
10 March 1665 – ?: Samuell Price
23 March 1666 – ?: Francis Burghill
16 March 1669 – ?: William Batterlee
10 July 1671 – ?: Francis Harris
17 July 1671 – ?: George Sanderson
23 July 1673 – ?: Thomas Skarlett

In Extraordinary
14 July 1660 – ?: John Cleeland
21 December 1660 – ?: Thomas Webb
14 February 1661 – ?: William Wakerfield
6 May 1661 – 10 July 1671?: Francis Harris
14 May 1662 – ?: Samuell Norrice
2 July 1662 – ?: James Bridgman
30 August 1662 – ?: Charles Gouldsmyth
30 September 1662 – ?: Isaack Page
2 February 1663 – ?: William Mercer
27 February 1663 – ?: John Rowe
28 February 1663 – ?: Martin Trott
9 March 1663 – ?: John Taylor
2 April 1663 – ?: Nicholas Coleburne
3 April 1663 – ?: Anderson Achley
6 July 1663 – ?: John Colemore
29 July 1663 – ?: William Rattrey
10 December 1663 – ?: James Jenever
27 January 1664 – ?: Uriah Babbington
20 August 1664 – ?: John Boys
20 August 1664 – ?: John Backhouse
12 November 1664 – 23 July 1673?: Thomas Skarlett
6 February 1665 – ?: Joshua Meriton
24 June 1665 – ?: Edward Bedill
9 December 1665 – ?: Henry Pate
19 January 1666 – aft. 1680?: Robert Marriell
1 March 1666 – ?: Edmund Cowse
6 March 1666 – ?: Daniell Skymer
5 May 1718 – 9 November 1719: Charles Bodens
11 December 1719 – 7 August 1722: Robert Tripp
5 February 1861 – 5 January 1882: John George Green

Extra Gentleman Ushers
Extra Gentleman Ushers gazetted without indicating them to be daily or quarterly waiters.

9 January 1850 – 1 March 1852: Wilbraham Taylor
5 April 1855 – ?: Norman Hilton Macdonald
8 December 1857 – 1 February 1859: Sir Spencer Cecil Brabazon Ponsonby
13 July 1892 – 1901?: Hon. Alexander Nelson Hood
1 January 1899 – 27 November 1899: Wyndham Frederick Tufnell

Lady & Gentleman Ushers (post-1901)

In Ordinary
23 July 1901 – 1 December 1915?: Hon. Sir Spencer Cecil Brabazon Ponsonby-Fane
23 July 1901 – 16 September 1925: Hon. Arthur Hay
23 July 1901 – 11 February 1911: Hon. Otway Frederick Seymour Cuffe
23 July 1901 – 7 February 1902: Hon. Aubrey FitzClarence
23 July 1901 – 1935?: Hon. Henry Julian Stonor
23 July 1901 – 26 January 1909: John Palmer Brabazon
23 July 1901 – 21 November 1911: Arthur Collins
23 July 1901 – 1 February 1928: Sir Lionel Henry Cust
23 July 1901 – 30 November 1908: Montague Charles Eliot
23 July 1901 – 1 April 1919: Sir Henry David Erskine
23 July 1901 – 14 November 1905: Charles James Innes-Ker
23 July 1901 – 7 May 1910?: Cuthbert Larking (not renewed 7 May 1910)
23 July 1901 – bef. 1919: Arnold Royle
23 July 1901 – 13 June 1903: John Ramsay Slade
23 July 1901 – 14 June 1908: Walter James Stopford
23 July 1901 – 1 April 1919: Brook Taylor
23 July 1901 – 24 June 1925: Horace Charles George West
7 February 1902 – 14 November 1905: Hon. Arthur Henry John Walsh (replacing FitzClarence)
13 June 1903 – 2 May 1927: Percy Armytage (replacing Slade)
14 November 1905 – 1913: Sir John Ramsay Slade (replacing Innes-Ker)
14 November 1905 – 18 July 1907?: Harry Lloyd-Verney (replacing Walsh)
18 July 1907 – 20 May 1916: Charles Windham (replacing Verney, who res. by 1 August 1907)
26 June 1908 – 13 October 1908: Charles Elphinstone Fleeming Cunninghame Graham (replacing Stopford)
13 October 1908 – 1 April 1919: Thomas Arthur Fitzhardinge Kingscote (replacing Graham)
30 November 1908 – 1 April 1919: Gerald Montagu Augustus Ellis (replacing Eliot)
26 January 1909 – 1 April 1919: Henry Fludyer (replacing Brabazon)
17 June 1910 – 2 January 1911: Hon. Seymour John Fortescue (replacing Larking?)
2 January 1911 – 21 July 1936: Montague Charles Eliot (replacing Fortescue)
11 February 1911 – 3 November 1924: Lord William Cecil (replacing Cuffe)
13 February 1912 – 15 February 1927: John Chaytor Brinton (replacing Collins)
30 September 1913 – 1914: William Leslie Davidson (replacing Slade)
1 April 1919 – 21 July 1936: Philip Nelson-Ward (replacing Erskine)
1 April 1919 – 4 May 1922: The Lord Dormer (replacing Royle)
1 April 1919 – 14 October 1932: Edmund Moore Cooper Cooper-Key
1 April 1919 – bef. 1936: Gerald Frederic Trotter (replacing Kingscote)
1 April 1919 – 22 April 1927: Montagu Grant Wilkinson (replacing Ellis)
1 April 1919 – 1 December 1931: Berkeley John Talbot Levett (replacing Fludyer)
1 April 1919 – 24 October 1928: Henry Peter Hansell (replacing Davidson)
6 June 1922 – 21 May 1934: Sir Hamnet Holditch Share (replacing Dormer)
1 March 1924 – 21 July 1936: Louis Greig
24 June 1925 – 13 February 1950?: Edmund Vivian Gabriel (replacing West)
16 September 1925 – 19 April 1966: Sir Humphrey Clifford Lloyd (replacing Hay)
15 February 1927 – 21 February 1964: Henry Valentine Bache de Satgé (replacing Brinton)
22 April 1927 – 21 July 1936: Sir Smith Hill Child, 2nd Baronet (replacing Wilkinson)
2 May 1927 – 12 January 1961: Sir Arthur Bromley, 8th Baronet (replacing Armytage)
1 February 1928 – 2 March 1937?: Hon. George Sidney Herbert (replacing Cust)
24 October 1928 – 21 July 1936: Sir Arthur D'Arcy Gordon Bannerman (replacing Hansell)
1 December 1931 – 7 May 1946: John Coldbrook Hanbury-Williams (replacing Levett)
14 October 1932 – 21 November 1939: John Lamplugh Wickham (replacing Cooper-Key)
21 May 1934 – 1 January 1952: Frederick Edward Packe (replacing Share)
21 July 1936 – 5 August 1952: Charles Alexander Lindsay Irvine
1 March 1937 – 5 August 1952?: Russell Lister-Kaye
1 March 1937 – 3 August 1951: Neville Charsley Tufnell
1 March 1937 – 1 January 1967: Geoffrey Ronald Codrington
1 March 1937 – 17 January 1964: William Duncan Phipps
1 March 1937 – 1 September 1954: Sir Frank Todd Spickernell
1 March 1937 – 1 January 1967: Philip Lloyd Neville
1 March 1937 – 1 December 1938: Hon. John Spencer Coke
1 December 1938 – 3 September 1955?: Guy Elland Carne Rasch (replacing Coke)
1 January 1952 – 10 November 1959: Sir George Ranald Macfarlane Reid (replacing Packe)
14 November 1952 – 1 July 1969: Sir John Mandeville Hugo
8 May 1953 – 1 April 1967: John Sidney North FitzGerald
bef. 1959: Frederick Robert Joseph Mack
10 November 1959 – 1 April 1967: Frederick George Beaumont-Nesbitt (replacing Mack)
10 November 1959 – 18 January 1966: Arthur Percy Ledger (replacing Reid)
9 May 1961 – 22 February 1995: Henry Louis Carron Greig
27 October 1964 – 25 July 1969: Richard Frank Sherlock Gooch
16 March 1965 – 28 January 1984: Michael Neville Tufnell
1 November 1966 – 9 June 1975: Sir James Newton Rodney Moore
1 November 1966 – 12 August 1979: Sir Maurice Lionel Heath
1 January 1967 – ?: John Arundell Holdsworth (replacing Codrington)
1 January 1967 – ?: William Henry Gerard Leigh (replacing Neville)
1 April 1967 – 1979: Sir Ronald Vernon Brockman (replacing FitzGerald)
3 October 1967 – 1979: Hon. Sir Peter Beckford Rutgers Vanneck
29 March 1971 – 12 July 1991: Sir Julian Paget, 4th Baronet
? – 20 April 1976: Sir James Bowes-Lyon
17 February 1978 – 20 October 1989: Sir Neville Stack
21 November 1978 – 14 August 1995: John Arthur Guinness Slessor
1 October 1979 – 1 October 1982: Sir David Williams
? 1979 – ? 1997: Major Nigel Chamberlayne-Macdonald
? – 1 January 1980: Sir Peter Bernard Gillett
1 January 1980 – 1 December 1989: Sir Desmond Hind Garrett Rice (replacing Gillett)
2 November 1982 – 28 June 1994: Sir Roy David Austen-Smith
2 November 1982 – 24 July 1994: Sir David Anning Loram
1984 – 2002: Michael Ernest Barrow
5 November 1985 – 3 October 1999: Michael Fulford-Dobson
28 February 1986 – 20 August 1998: Sir Richard Maurice Hilton Vickers
20 October 1989 – 31 January 2001: Barry Hamilton Newton (replacing Stack)
12 July 1991 – 17 June 2004: Henry Malcolm Chitty Havergal
28 June 1994 – 2009: Colin Herbert Dickinson Cooke-Priest (replacing Austen-Smith)
10 November 1994 – 4 April 2007: Air Vice Marshal David Hawkins, later Hawkins-Leth (replacing Loram)
22 February 1995 – 1 January 2008: Major General Brian Pennicott
1997 – 15 January 2017: Gordon Thomas Riddell Birdwood (d. 15 January 2017)
20 August 1998 – 29 July 1999: Robert Cartwright (replacing Vickers?)
29 July 1999 – 5 July 2016: Lieutenant Colonel Oliver Breakwell (replacing Cartwright)
3 October 1999 – 31 July 2011: Paddy McKnight (replacing Fulford-Dobson)
2002 – 30 April 2013: Air Vice Marshal Richard Henry Kyle
2002 – 31 December 2015: Commodore John Hance RN (replacing Barrow)
17 June 2004 – 31 March 2015: Major General George Kennedy (replacing Havergal)
4 April 2007 – 22 April 2022: Air Vice Marshal David Hobart (replacing David Hawkins-Leth) 
1 January 2008 – present: Major Grant Baker (replacing Pennicott)
1 August 2009 – 5 December 2017: Commodore Laurie Hopkins (replacing Cooke-Priest)
1 February 2011 – 22 April 2022: Air Commodore Malcolm Fuller (replacing Newton)
1 August 2011 – present: Commodore Christopher Laurence Palmer (replacing McKnight)
4 January 2013 – present: Air Vice Marshal Richard Lacey (replacing Kyle)
31 March 2015 – present: Lieutenant Colonel Sir Alexander Matheson of Matheson, 7th Baronet (replacing Kennedy)
1 January 2016 – present: Commodore Jonathan Handley (replacing Hance)
6 July 2016 – present: Major General Matthew Sykes (replacing Breakwell)
4 May 2017 – present: Brigadier Jonathan Bourne-May (replacing Birdwood)
6 December 2017 – present: Captain David Lilley RN (replacing Hopkins)
1 October 2021 – present:  Air Vice-Marshal Elaine West (replacing Fuller)
1 October 2021 – present: Air Vice Marshal David Murray (replacing Hobart)

Extra
1 April 1919 – bef. 1936: Brook Taylor
1 April 1919 – 1935?: Thomas Arthur Fitzhardinge Kingscote
1 April 1919 – aft. 1937: Gerald Montagu Augustus Ellis (d. 1953)
1 April 1919 – 1920: Henry Fludyer
3 November 1924 – 1937: Lord William Cecil
16 September 1925 – bef. 1936: Hon. Arthur Hay
22 April 1927 – aft. 1937: Montagu Grant Wilkinson
2 May 1927 – bef. 1936: Percy Armytage
1 February 1928 – 12 October 1929?: Sir Lionel Henry Cust
24 October 1928 – bef. 1936: Henry Peter Hansell
1 December 1931 – aft. 1937: Berkeley John Talbot Levett
14 October 1932 – bef. 1936: Edmund Moore Cooper Cooper-Key
21 May 1934 – 1937: Sir Hamnet Holditch Share
21 July 1936 – bef. 1952: Philip Nelson-Ward
21 July 1936 – 27 April 1955: Sir Arthur D'Arcy Gordon Bannerman, 12th Baronet
1 March 1937 – 1 March 1953: Louis Greig
1 December 1938 – aft. 1952: John Spencer Coke
21 November 1939 – bef. 1952: John Lamplugh Wickham
7 May 1946 – aft. 1952: Sir John Coldbrook Hanbury-Williams
1 August 1950 – aft. 1952: Sir John Berkeley Monck
8 December 1950 – aft. 1952: Sir Algar Henry Stafford Howard
2 March 1951 – aft. 1952: Andrew Vavasour Scott Yates
2 March 1951 – aft. 1952: Thomas Cockayne Harvey
1 January 1952 – aft. 1952: Frederick Edward Packe
5 August 1952 – aft. 1952: Charles Alexander Lindsay Irvine
1 September 1954 – ?: Sir Frank Todd Spickernell
24 May 1955 – ?: Ernest Frederick Orby Gascoigne
24 May 1955 – ?: Charles Richard Britten
8 November 1955 – 11 September 1964: Frederic Hudd
8 November 1955 – 29 March 1957: Valston Eldridge Hancock
8 November 1955 – 6 June 1958: John Graham Hale
8 November 1955 – 23 April 1957: Shaukat Ali Shah
8 November 1955 – 1 April 1960: Christopher Fernando
29 March 1957 – 14 October 1958: Edmund John Buchanan Foxcroft (replacing Hancock)
23 April 1957 – 6 January 1961: Sultan Mohammed (replacing Shah)
24 May 1957 – 1961: Sir Marcus Cheke
6 June 1958 – 27 April 1962: John Vivian Scott (replacing Hale)
2 August 1958 – 9 July 1966: Sir John Dashwood, 10th Baronet
14 October 1958 – 5 January 1960: Robert William Knights (replacing Foxcroft)
10 November 1959 – 1991?:  Sir George Ranald Macfarlane Reid
10 November 1959 – ?: Esmond Butler
5 January 1960 – 1960: Robert Durie (replacing Knights) (d. 1960)
1 April 1960 – ?: Mirisiya Ananda Jeewasoma (replacing Fernando)
27 May 1960 – 6 March 1962: Alister Murray Murdoch (replacing Durie)
6 January 1961 – ?: Irshad Ahmad Khan (replacing Mohammed)
24 January 1961 – 27 December 1970: Brigadier Sir Ivan de la Bere
14 November 1961 – ?: Sir Henry Austin Strutt
6 March 1962 – 30 September 1966: William Richard Cumming
27 April 1962 – 13 March 1964: Donald Geoffrey Harper (replacing Scott)
12 June 1962 – 27 October 1964: Richard Frank Sherlock Gooch
21 February 1964 – 1964: Henry Valentine Bache de Satgé
13 March 1964 – 23 March 1965: John Malcolm Kirk Hill (replacing Harper)
21 April 1964 – ?: Geoffrey Clark Hartnell
11 September 1964 – 22 October 1965: Alain Chartier Edmond Joly de Lotbinière (replacing Hudd)
23 March 1965 – 21 March 1967: Jeremy Paul Axford Commons (replacing Hill)
22 October 1965 – 23 August 1966: Michel de Goumois (replacing de Lotbinière)
18 January 1966 – ?: Arthur Percy Ledger
19 April 1966 – ?: Sir Humphrey Clifford Lloyd
23 August 1966 – ?: Jacques Claude Noiseux (replacing de Goumois)
30 September 1966 – 2 February 1968: Francis George Hassett (replacing Cumming)
1 January 1967 – ?: Geoffrey Ronald Codrington
1 January 1967 – ?: Philip Lloyd Neville
21 March 1967 – 31 July 1970: Bruce Walter Middleton (replacing Commons)
1 April 1967 – ?: John Sidney North FitzGerald
1 April 1967 – ?: Frederick George Beaumont-Nesbitt
2 February 1968 – 17 November 1970: Andrew Leslie Moore (replacing Hassett)
20 August 1968 – ?: Sir Cyril Harry Colquhoun
1 July 1969 – 2000: Sir John Mandeville Hugo
25 July 1969 – 6 June 1973: Richard Frank Sherlock Gooch
25 November 1969 – 6 February 1975: Sir John Mitchell Harvey Wilson, 2nd Baronet 
31 July 1970 – ?: Nicholas William Bridge (replacing Middleton)
17 November 1970 – 5 June 1971: Air Vice-Marshal Frank Headlam (replacing Moore)
5 June 1971 – 1 November 1974: William Richard Cumming (replacing Headlam)
1 November 1974 – 1 December 1977: John Wilkins Hubble (replacing Cumming)
9 June 1975 – 1985: Sir Rodney Moore
20 April 1976 – 1977: Sir James Bowes-Lyon
1 December 1977 – 30 June 1981: Francis Conynghame Murray (replacing Hubble)
12 August 1979 – 9 July 1988: Sir Maurice Lionel Heath
30 June 1981 – 3 August 1982: Richard Malcolm Baird (replacing Murray)
30 June 1981 – 26 July 2010: Sir James Henry Scholtens
30 June 1981 – 2010: Sir Patrick Jerad O'Dea
30 June 1981 – ?: Percy Stewart Cooper
3 August 1982 – ?: Robert John Whitten (replacing Baird)
1 October 1982 – 16 July 2012: Sir David Williams
28 January 1984 – ?: Michael Neville Tufnell
1984 – ?: Henry Francis Davis
2 December 1986 – 2009: Sir Russell Dillon Wood
25 June 1985 – 5 February 1988: Captain Peter Volney Blackman, R.A.N.
5 February 1988 – ?: David Robert Lawrence (replacing Blackman)
20 October 1989 – January 1994: Sir Neville Stack
1 December 1989 –  14 July 2020: Sir Desmond Hind Garrett Rice
12 July 1991 – 25 September 2016: Sir Julian Paget, 4th Baronet
1 January 1993 – present: Stanley William Frederick Martin
1 October 1993 – ?: John Haslam
1 December 1993 – 7 September 2006: Sir Norman James Blacklock
28 June 1994 – 27 March 2021: Sir Roy David Austen-Smith
24 July 1994 – 30 June 2011: Sir David Anning Loram
22 February 1995 – 11 July 2012: Sir Henry Louis Carron Greig
14 August 1995 – 11 March 2008: Group Captain John Arthur Guinness Slessor
? 1997 - 15 August 2013: Major Nigel Chamberlayne-Macdonald
1999 – present: Captain Michael Fulford-Dobson 
2002 – 2013: Captain Michael Ernest Barrow Royal Navy
17 June 2004 – present: Colonel Henry Malcolm Chitty Havergal
4 April 2007 –  31 January 2019: Air Vice Marshal David Hawkins-Heth
13 November 2007 – present: Surgeon Captain David Swain, RN
1 January 2008 – present: Major General Brian Pennicott
1 August 2009 – 6 April 2020: Rear Admiral Colin Herbert Dickinson Cooke-Priest
1 February 2011 – 25 August 2020: Air Vice Marshal Barry Hamilton Newton
1 August 2011 – present: Captain Paddy McKnight Royal Navy
4 January 2013 – present: Air Vice Marshal Richard Kyle
1 April 2015 – present: Major General George Kennedy
1 January 2016 – present: Commodore John Hance Royal Navy
7 July 2016 – 25 May 2021: Lieutenant Colonel Oliver Breakwell
5 December 2017 – present: Commodore Laurie Hopkins Royal Navy
22 April 2022 – present: Air Commodore Malcolm Fuller
22 April 2022 – present: Air Vice Marshall David Hobart

Honorary
9 July 1903 – 13 October 1908: Thomas Arthur Fitzhardinge Kingscote
11 June 1909 – 11 February 1911: Lord William Cecil

References

The London Gazette

Gentleman Ushers
Positions within the British Royal Household